USCGC Neah Bay (WTGB-105) is the fifth vessel of the  built in 1980 and operated by the United States Coast Guard. The ship was named after a bay located within the state of Washington and bordered by Puget Sound.

Design 

The 140-foot Bay-class tugboats operated primarily for domestic ice breaking duties. They are named after American bays and are stationed mainly in the northeast United States and the Great Lakes.

WTGBs use a low pressure air hull lubrication or bubbler system that forces air and water between the hull and ice. This system improves icebreaking capabilities by reducing resistance against the hull, reducing horsepower requirements.

Construction and career 
Neah Bay was laid down by the Tacoma Boatbuilding Co., in Tacoma, Washington on 6 August 1979. She was launched on 16 February 1980 and later commissioned in Cleveland, on 25 October 1980.

A Himalayan cat named Casca in which was rescued by Lt. Commander Molly Waters during a stint in Alaska, now sits on board the ship.

Awards 

 Coast Guard Presidential Unit Citation
 Secretary of Transportation Outstanding Unit Award
 Coast Guard Unit Commendation
 Coast Guard Meritorious Unit Commendation
 Coast Guard Bicentennial Unit Commendation
 National Defense Service Medal
 Global War on Terrorism Service Medal
 Humanitarian Service Medal
 Transportation 9-11 Ribbon
 Coast Guard Special Operations Service Ribbon
 Coast Guard Sea Service Ribbon

References

United States Coast Guard home page
United States Coast Guard Reservist Magazine

External links 

 United States Coast Guard: Neah Bay
 TogetherWeServed: Neah Bay Crew Members

Bay-class icebreaking tugs
1980 ships
Ships built in Tacoma, Washington